Brekeke SIP Server is a SIP-based SIP Proxy Server and Registrar. This software was previously known as OnDO SIP Server from 2003 to 2006. Brekeke Software, Inc. released the second version of the software in 2007 and changed its name to Brekeke SIP Server. It authenticates and registers user agents, such as VoIP devices and softphones, and routes SIP sessions between user agents. Brekeke Software, Inc. has developed two versions of this software: Standard Edition and Advanced Edition. Brekeke SIP Server offers, among other things, SIP over TCP/UDP support, TLS support, original NAT traversal functionality, SIP Redundancy feature.

SIP Compliant 
Brekeke SIP Server is SIP-compliant (RFC 3261 Standard), which ensures that it has the highest level of interoperability with other SIP devices and services. This also makes Brekeke SIP Server interoperable with other clients, such as Google Voice and Skype Connect.

Reception
In 2007, Brekeke SIP Server was one of 140 recipients of the Technology Marketing Corporation's 2006 Product of the Year Award for Communications Solutions.

In 2011, Brekeke SIP Server was one of 120 recipients of the INTERNET TELEPHONY Magazine's 2010 Product Of The Year Award.

References

External links 
 

Telecommunications companies of the United States
VoIP software